Comus is a masque in three acts by English composer Thomas Arne. The work uses a libretto by John Dalton (1709-1763) that is based on John Milton's 1634 masque of the same name. The work was first performed at the Theatre Royal, Drury Lane, London, on 4 March 1738.

History
Comus was Arne's first major success, and the masque enjoyed regular revivals throughout his lifetime. The work boasts some of his finest music with songs like "Now Phoebus sinketh in the West" and "Would you taste the noontide air" displaying a fresh lyrical style. The work was published in 1740 but without the recitatives and choruses. The original score containing the additional music is now lost, but a copy of that score, made around 1785, does exist with all of the original music and some additional pieces taken from Handel’s L'Allegro, il Penseroso ed il Moderato that supplement Arne’s limited chorus writing.

Roles

Synopsis
A lady is lost in the forest where the magician Comus dwells; masquerading as a shepherd he entices her to his palace. A spirit warns the lady's two brothers that their sister is in Comus's control. They are waylayed by Comus's stooges. The spirit supplies the brothers with an enchanted potion to help them thwart Comus's spell over the lady. A banquet is organized in Comus's palace and the lady, succumbed to the power of the spell, is diverted by the songs and dances of the festivities. Comus forcefully encourages her to drink from his cup but the brothers dash in just in time, putting Comus to flight. The nymph Sabrina frees the lady from the magician's spell and all rejoice the triumph of virtue in the masque's final chorus.

Sources

1738 operas
Operas
Operas by Thomas Arne
English-language operas